On October 31, 1870, a popular insurrection occupied Paris's City Hall (Hôtel de Ville). Amidst the Franco-Prussian War, Parisians simultaneously heard of losses at Le Bourget and Metz alongside armstice negotiations. Incensed by what they viewed as treason, a group of 300 to 400 demonstrated at the City Hall and members of the left-wing National Guard captured and occupied the building with several members of the Government of National Defense inside.

References

Bibliography 

 

Rebellions in France
October 1870 events
Events in Paris
Franco-Prussian War